Lapid is a surname with multiple origins:  
, lit. "torch"), a Hebrew-language surname. 
"Lapid" is also a Hiligaynon language (Philippines) word denoting a galley with three banks of oars, also known as balangay.

Notable people with the surname include:
 (1948-2018), Israeli film editor and lecturer in cinema
 Erez Lapid, Israeli mathematician
Jess Lapid Jr., Filipino actor
Jess Lapid Sr., Filipino actor
Lihi Lapid (born 1968), Israeli author, photojournalist, and  columnist
Lito Lapid, Filipino actor and politician
Mark Lapid, Filipino actor and politician
Nadav Lapid, Israeli film director and screenwriter
Percy Lapid (1959-2022), Filipino radio anchor
 Shulamit Lapid, Israeli novelist and playwright
Tommy Lapid, Israeli journalist and politician
 Yair Lapid, 14th prime minister of Israel

See also

References

Hebrew-language surnames